Boskoop glory is a disease-resistant, cold-tolerant grape variety from the Netherlands, It is thought to be a hybrid between Vitis vinifera and Vitis labrusca. It was developed in the 1950s at Wageningen where American vines had been planted. It is therefore assumed to be a spontaneous crossing of two species from the vineyard.
This variety usually ripens fruit in late August or early September and is resistant to fungal diseases and frost. It is a popular table grape in the Netherlands and it is popular among gardeners in the Netherlands, England, Germany and much of Northern Europe. The flavour is very aromatic and juicy. 

Table grape varieties